
On 5 September 1996 at 22:44 local time (CEST, 20:44 UTC), southern Dalmatia, Croatia, was hit by a strong earthquake of moment magnitude 6.0.

Damage
Three villages were completely destroyed, and there was damage in much of southern Dalmatia, up to Zagvozd and Grabovac. About 1,400 buildings were damaged and 474 rendered uninhabitable in the epicentral area. Some of the destroyed buildings had been weakened by a 4.7 earthquake off Mljet in July 1995. Fortunately, there were no fatalities. However, several people were injured, and more than 2,000 were displaced according to the United States Geological Survey. According to the Croatian Radiotelevision, there were no injuries. Landslides and collapsed structures blocked the roads to the villages of Mravinca, Trnova and Podimoć. One of the aftershocks temporarily blocked the Adriatic Highway, the principal thoroughfare of the Dubrovnik region. Massive boulders were dislodged and rolled down the mountain, in one case colliding with a house. The earthquake reduced groundwater levels, and created a submarine spring between Ston and Doli, where the emitted soil and mud temporarily turned the sea red. The town of Ston took about a decade to recover from the effects of the earthquake.

Earthquake
This was the largest earthquake with an epicentre in the Dubrovnik area since the violent 1667 Dubrovnik earthquake, and the peak horizontal acceleration (PGA) of 0.643 g measured at the Ston saltworks remains the highest observed in Croatia. The significant degree of soil amplification in Ston caused high PGA values of up to 0.313 g in some of the aftershocks as well. The rupture began on the reverse Slano Fault or possibly on the Pelješac Fault, beginning  from Slano and continuing for about  northwestwards to Ston, where the ground displacement reached . Multiple faults were activated during the earthquake.

Aftershocks

See also
 List of earthquakes in 1996
 List of earthquakes in Croatia
 2020 Petrinja earthquake

References

Sources

External links

Earthquakes in Croatia
Ston-Slano
Ston-Slano earthquake
History of Dalmatia
Ston-Slano earthquake
1996 disasters in Europe